, was a samurai in service to the Minamoto clan during the Genpei War of Japan's late Heian period.

The Heike monogatari records an anecdote about a friendly competition with Sasaki Takatsuna prior to the second battle of Uji.  Mounted on Yoritomo's black horse, Surusumi, he races Takatsuna across the River Uji.

Kagesue was killed along with his father Kagetoki at Suruga by men loyal to Minamoto no Yoriie.

Notes

References
 Kitagawa, Hiroshi and Burce T. Tsuchida, ed. (1975). The Tale of the Heike. Tokyo: University of Tokyo Press. ; 
 Nussbaum, Louis Frédéric and Käthe Roth. (2005). Japan Encyclopedia. Cambridge: Harvard University Press. ; 
 Varley, Paul. (1994). Warriors of Japan as Portrayed in the War Tales. Honolulu: University of Hawaii Press. ; ; 

Samurai
1200 deaths
1162 births